Jacques Lesure (born December 19, 1962, in Detroit, Michigan, United States) is an American jazz guitarist and recording artist. He is signed to WJ3 Records. His performances can be heard in La La Land, the Academy Award winning movie.

Life and career 
Lesure was born in Detroit and first began playing guitars at the age of 10 in his church. He was influenced by people like George Benson and Kenny Burrell. His professional career started in gospel music with The Clark Sisters, Commissioned and other prominent Detroit gospel musicians, while studying jazz at the same time. In 1980 he became fully involved in jazz. Lesure is also an author, motivational speaker and radio/podcast host. He has performed with several jazz artists, such as Jimmy Smith and Stanley Turrentine as well as Wynton Marsalis, Eric Reed, Warren Wolf and Gregory Porter.

Discography 
 A Crenshaw Christmas 2010, TLG Records
 When She Smiles 2013, WJ3 Records
 Camaraderie 2015, WJ3 Records
 For The Love of You 2017, WJ3 Records

References 

1962 births
Living people
American jazz singers
American jazz guitarists
Musicians from Detroit
20th-century American guitarists
Jazz musicians from Michigan
WJ3 Records artists